Fallen Arches is a 1998 crime film starring Richard Portnow, Karen Black, Ron Thompson, Peter Onorati, Tamara Braun, Carmine Giovinazzo, Louis Ferreira and written, produced and directed by Ron Cosentino.

Plot
A street smart young guy tries to save his younger brother when a mobster takes a hit out on him for stealing a truckload of designer shoes.

References

External links

1998 films
American crime films
1998 crime films
1998 directorial debut films
1990s English-language films
1990s American films